The Coalition Avenir Québec (CAQ;) is a Quebec nationalist, autonomist and conservative provincial political party in Quebec.

It was founded by former Parti Québécois (PQ) cabinet minister François Legault and businessman Charles Sirois; Legault also serves as the party leader.  The party membership includes both Quebec nationalists and federalists. Legault has said it will never endorse a referendum on sovereignty, but will seek more autonomy if necessary.

Not long after its formation, the party gained nine sitting Members of the National Assembly of Quebec (MNAs) who had been elected as members of the PQ and of the Action démocratique du Québec (ADQ); the ADQ later merged with the CAQ in January 2012. The party is registered with the Director-General of Elections in Quebec under the name Coalition avenir Québec – L'équipe François Legault.

Members and supporters of the party are referred to as "caquistes", derived from the French pronunciation of the party's initials.  However, the party has requested that the term "coalisés" be used instead.

On 1 October 2018, the CAQ won a majority of seats in the National Assembly of Quebec, allowing it to form a government for the first time. It increased its majority in the 2022 elections.

History

Foundation and 2012 provincial election
In February 2011, François Legault and Charles Sirois held a press conference to announce the formation of a movement called the Coalition pour l'avenir du Québec.

In September 2011, the CAQ began discussions with the ADQ on the possibility of a merger between the two groups. The two parties were very similar ideologically.

On 14 November 2011, Legault held a press conference to launch the movement as a political party under the slightly modified name of Coalition Avenir Québec, unveiling a new logo at the same time. The actual registration of the party with the Chief Electoral Officer of Quebec had already taken place on 4 November.

On 13 December 2011, the CAQ and the ADQ announced an agreement in principle to merge, pending final approval with the ADQ membership.

On 19 December 2011, two former PQ MNAs (Benoit Charette and Daniel Ratthé) and two former ADQ MNAs (Éric Caire and Marc Picard) who had earlier left their respective parties to sit as independents announced that they were joining the CAQ, becoming the new party's first sitting members.

In January 2012, PQ MNA François Rebello switched party affiliation to the CAQ, becoming its fifth sitting member.

On 21 January 2012, the results of the ADQ's mail-in vote were announced: of the 54% of members who voted, 70% approved the merger with the CAQ. The ADQ's four remaining MNAs—Sylvie Roy of Lotbinière, Janvier Grondin of Beauce-Nord, François Bonnardel of Shefford, and leader Gérard Deltell of Chauveau—joined the CAQ, boosting its caucus to nine.

On 23 January 2012, the CAQ announced its first president, Dominique Anglade, who would also be a candidate for the party in the next election. She left the party in 2015, cited objections to the CAQ's positions on ethnic identity and immigration and ran for the Quebec Liberal Party.

On 5 August 2012, Jacques Duchesneau, the whistleblower behind Quebec's anti-corruption unit, announced his candidacy for the riding of Saint-Jérôme in the 2012 provincial election. He won the MNA seat.

On 4 September 2012, the CAQ won 19 seats in the 2012 provincial election.

2014 provincial election

In the 2014 provincial election held on 7 April, the CAQ won 22 seats, a gain of three seats. The TVA-sponsored second televised debate was noted as a turning point in the campaign and party leader François Legault's performance reflected positively on the CAQ's standing.  Therefore, early voting results revealed a disastrous outcome for the party, while ballots cast on Election Day were much more favourable.

Also, overall returns marked a significant geographic shift in the CAQ electoral base. In the Capitale-Nationale area, reputed for its conservative leanings and the influence of its talk-radio hosts, the Quebec Liberal Party won four of the six seats previously held by the CAQ.  A strategic vote of the anti-PQ electorate, as well as a pledge by Legault to spend no public money on projects dear to Mayor Régis Labeaume, such as the construction of a $97.5 million covered ice rink, the completion of the $60 million theatre Le Diamant, promoted by Robert Lepage, and the $20 million revitalization of the French colonial era new barracks, are possible causes for the backlash.

The CAQ losses in the Capitale-Nationale area were largely compensated with a significant breakthrough in the "450 area" (Laurentides, Lanaudière and Montérégie), where it ended up with seven more seats.

Meanwhile, the CAQ support in Chaudière-Appalaches and Centre-du-Québec remained steady.

After 2014 provincial election 
On 15 August 2014, CAQ MNA for Lévis Christian Dubé resigned his seat to take a job at the Caisse de dépôt et placement.

The subsequent 20 October 2014 by-election was won by CAQ candidate François Paradis with 47 per cent of the popular vote.

Following much speculation, Gérard Deltell announced on 7 April 2015, that he would be running for the federal Conservative Party of Canada in the riding of Louis-Saint-Laurent in the upcoming 2015 federal election. His resignation as MNA for Chauveau took effect the same day.

On 26 August 2015, CAQ MNA Sylvie Roy resigned to sit as an independent following personal issues with party leadership.

On 2 October 2017, Geneviève Guilbault won a byelection in the riding of Louis-Hébert that had long been held by the Quebec Liberal Party, winning over 51 per cent of the vote.

2018 Quebec provincial election and Legault government
On 1 October 2018, the CAQ won 74 seats, a gain of 53 seats compared to their performance in 2014, propelling them from third place to a strong majority government. The CAQ won 37.4 percent of the vote, four percentage points fewer than what the Liberals tallied four years earlier, and the lowest vote share on record for a party winning an outright majority. However, the CAQ dominated its traditional heartlands and also scored sweeps or near-sweeps in Mauricie, Estrie, Lanaudière, Montérégie, the Laurentides and northern Quebec. Historically, Quebec elections have seen very large disparities between the raw vote and actual seat count.

This marked the first time since the 1966 election, which was won by the now-defunct Union Nationale, that a party other than the Quebec Liberals or the Parti Québécois formed government in Quebec. It was also the first time since then that a centre-right party had won government in the province.

The CAQ picked up support from a number of former PQ supporters who had come to believe there was no realistic chance of becoming independent from Canada. For instance, Patrick Légaré, a longtime PQ supporter from the longstanding sovereigntist stronghold of Terrebonne, told The Guardian that he decided to vote for the CAQ because he believed "the dream of a separate Quebec is dead." His main concern was finding "someone who can beat the Liberals–and it isn't the PQ." As it turned out, most of the CAQ's gains came at the expense of the PQ, with several ridings that had been in PQ hands for four decades or more falling by landslide margins.

The CAQ then took the seat vacated by the resignation of former premier Philippe Couillard in a by-election held 10 December 2018, increasing its total to 75 seats.

In December 2019 the party won the by-election in Jean-Talon and in April 2022 won the by-election in Marie-Victorin, both of which had been Liberal and Parti Québécois strongholds, raising its seat total to 76.

The party won another majority government in the 2022 elections, raising their seat count to 90.

Ideology and policies 

The party long described itself as being neither of the left nor the right: it is not particularly economically conservative, with economic policies similar to the Quebec Liberal Party and social policies to their right. However, its politics have been described in the press as centre-right and populist by Quebec standards. From the time the CAQ's merger with the ADQ until the Conservative Party of Quebec gained its first MNA in 2021, the CAQ was the right-most party in the National Assembly.

The party includes former federal Conservatives, provincial Liberals and ex-péquistes. 

The party proposes government investment in education and partial decentralization of the healthcare system. They promise "to further develop the entrepreneurial culture in Québec" and provide government resources for the private sector. The party also supports austerity "to provide the government with the flexibility it needs to adapt to the ongoing changes in the economy"; one measure specifically mentioned is leaving 6,000 open Hydro-Québec employment positions unfilled.

The party supports abolishing school boards and increasing the autonomy of principals and their governing boards.

The CAQ contends that the near half-century debate over sovereignty has hampered Quebec's economic and political progress. While the party does not support independence, it does identify as nationalist; it believes Quebec can thrive in Canada if the federal government is willing to grant more powers to the province. On 10 April 2014, Legault, previously a staunch sovereignist, stated that a CAQ government would never hold a referendum on leaving Canada: "[There] will never be a referendum for the life of the coalition even after 10 years, even after 20 years, so that's clear. And I was clear but people understood something else." François Legault added, "Once it is clear that there will never be a referendum with the Coalition Avenir Québec, the anglophones and allophones, who don't want a referendum, have to understand that we offer an alternative to the Liberals."

Legault has stated "aggressive[ly]" that a CAQ government would not repeal Bill 101. He has also stated that a CAQ government will demand greater power for Quebec.

The party introduced an electoral reform bill in September 2019. It abandoned plans to hold a referendum on electoral reform in the 2022 general election claiming there was not enough time.

The party is critical of the system of equalization payments in Canada and plans to remove Quebec from receiving such payments.

According to the party, Quebec is defined by "its historical heritage, the French language, its democratic ideals and the principles of the secularity of the State, and equality among men and women". The Party supported the Quebec ban on face covering but also argue the ban is not extensive enough. They propose to prohibit the wearing of religious symbols by personnel in a position of authority, including teachers. The party supports interculturalism to "integrate newcomers".  This includes limiting immigration and promoting the use of French without creating new barriers. However, they want to exempt Quebec from the requirements of multiculturalism. In 2018, it proposed cutting the number of immigrants by 20 per cent, to 40,000 annually. However, it plans to bring back numbers up to 52,000 a year in 2022.

Election results

House leaders

House whips

Party presidents

Campaign slogans
 2012: C'est assez, faut que ça change ! (Enough, things have to change!)
 2014: On se donne Legault (Let's give ourselves Legault) (Play on words with "go ahead")
 2018: Maintenant. (Now.)
 2022: "Continuons," ("Let's keep going.")

References

External links

 
Organizations based in Montreal
Political parties established in 2011
Provincial political parties in Quebec
2011 establishments in Quebec
Conservative parties in Canada
Right-wing politics in Canada
Right-wing parties in North America
Centre-right parties
Quebec nationalism
Autonomy